The following is a list of episodes of the Norwegian situation comedy Mot i brøstet. The series consisted of 141 episodes which were first broadcast between January 22, 1993 and December 8, 1997.

Season 1 (1993)

Season 2 (1994)

Season 3 (1994/95)

Season 4 (1995)

Season 5 (1995/96)

Season 6 (1996)

Season 7 (1997)

Season 8 (1997)

Mot i brostet